William Handcock may refer to:

William Handcock (Westmeath politician) (c. 1631–1707), Irish MP for Westmeath 1661–1666, 1703–1707, Athlone 1692–1699
William Handcock (1654–1701), Irish MP for Boyle and Dublin City, Recorder of Dublin, his son
William Handcock (1676–1723), Irish MP for Athlone 1703–1714, Westmeath 1721–1723
William Handcock (1704–1741), his son, Irish MP for Fore
William Handcock (1737–1794), Irish MP for Athlone 1759–1783. his nephew
William Handcock, 1st Viscount Castlemaine (1761–1839), Irish and British MP for Athlone 1783–1803
William Handcock (Australian politician) (1808–1890), briefly a member of the New South Wales Legislative Assembly (1859)